Veera Sivaji is a 2016 Indian Tamil-language action film directed by Ganesh Vinayak, starring Vikram Prabhu and Shamili. The film began production during July 2015. Released worldwide on December 16, 2016, it met with extremely negative reviews and was a disaster at the box office.

Plot 
Shivaji, a taxi driver, has to arrange money for his niece's surgery. Things go awry when he gets entangled in a web of deceit.

Cast

Vikram Prabhu as Sivaji
Shamili as Anjali 
Manisha Shree as Anjali's friend
G. Marimuthu as Anjali's father
Rajendran as CBI Officer
VTV Ganesh as Security Officer
Yogi Babu as Ramesh
Robo Shankar as Suresh
Andreanne Nouyrigat as Foreign Lady
Mahanadi Shankar as Prisoner
John Vijay
Mansoor Ali Khan
Baby Sathanya as Yazhini
Babu G as Businessman
Kaavya Sha as Soppana Sundhari (song appearance)

Production
Producer Nandagopal announced that he had signed on Vikram Prabhu to star in his film during July 2015 and that Ganesh Vinayak, who had made Thagaraaru (2013), would direct the film. The film also marked the return of former child actress Shamili, who had taken a sabbatical after a brief foray into films in 2009. Featuring an ensemble cast including Rajendran, John Vijay and Robo Shankar, the first schedule of Veera Sivaji was shot in Pondicherry from September 2015. A song choreographed by Dinesh was pictured on the beaches of the town, later that month. The film's first schedule was finished in November 2015, with the makers revealing that the film would focus on a relationship around Vikram Prabhu's character and a child. A second schedule for the film was filmed across Chennai from mid November 2015.

Music

Music has been composed by D Imman which contains totally 6 songs in this movie including the theme music. Imman later reused some of the songs from the film in Kannada film Hyper (2018) also directed by Ganesh Vinayak.

References

External links
 

2016 films
2010s Tamil-language films
Indian action thriller films
Films scored by D. Imman
Films shot in Chennai
Films shot in Puducherry
2016 action thriller films